Neanias is a genus of Orthopterans, sometimes known as 'leaf-folding crickets' in the subfamily Gryllacridinae and tribe Gryllacridini.  The recorded distribution (probably incomplete) is: Indian subcontinent, Japan, Hainan, Indochina, and western Malesia (Sumatra).

Species 
The Orthoptera Species File lists:
 Neanias amplus Gorochov, 2008
 Neanias angustipennis Gorochov, 2008
 Neanias atroterminatus Karny, 1937
 Neanias bezzii Griffini, 1914
 Neanias erinaceus Gorochov, 2008
 Neanias magnus Matsumura & Shiraki, 1908
 Neanias medius Gorochov, 2008
 Neanias ogasawarensis Vickery & Kevan, 1999
 Neanias parvus Gorochov, 2008
 Neanias pliginskyi Gorochov, 2008
 Neanias squamatus Brunner von Wattenwyl, 1888 - type species (by subsequent designation)
 Neanias subapterus Karny, 1924
 Neanias virens Ingrisch, 2018

References

External links

Ensifera genera
Gryllacrididae
Orthoptera of Indo-China
Orthoptera of Malesia